Kath or KATH may refer to:

 Kath (city), the historical capital of Khwarezm
 Kath (name), a list of people and fictional characters with the given name or surname
 KATH-TV, the NBC TV station in Juneau, Alaska
 KATH (AM), a radio station in Texas

See also
 Cath (disambiguation)